Vamouti Diomande (born 20 January 1991) is an Ivorian footballer who plays as a midfielder. He has previously played for First Division sides Sandefjord, Hønefoss, Ullensaker/Kisa and Mjøndalen.

Club career
Born in Abidjan, Diomande joined Mjøndalen's first-team squad ahead of the 2012 season.

Career statistics

References

1991 births
Living people
Footballers from Abidjan
Norwegian footballers
Sandefjord Fotball players
Hønefoss BK players
Mjøndalen IF players
Eliteserien players
Norwegian First Division players
Norwegian expatriate footballers
Association football midfielders